The Herzog von Ratibor-Rennen is a Group 3 flat horse race in Germany open to two-year-old thoroughbreds. It is run at Krefeld over a distance of 1,700 metres (1 mile and 99 yards), and it is scheduled to take place each year in November.

History
The event was established in 1876, and it was initially called the Deutscher Gestüt-Preis. It was originally run at Hoppegarten over 1,200 metres.

The race was renamed the Herzog von Ratibor-Rennen in the 1890s. It was named after Viktor, Herzog von Ratibor (1818–93), who served as chairman of German racing's Union-Club.

The Herzog von Ratibor-Rennen was extended to 1,400 metres in 1906. It was moved to Grunewald and cut to 1,200 metres in 1918. It was restored to 1,400 metres in 1920, and returned to Hoppegarten in 1925.

The race was cancelled in 1945 and 1946. It was held at Gelsenkirchen in 1947 and Dortmund in 1948. It was transferred to Krefeld in 1949, and from this point was usually staged in September.

For a period the Herzog von Ratibor-Rennen held Listed status. It was relegated to National Listed level in 1993, and regained its former status in 2003. It was promoted to Group 3, switched to November and increased to 1,700 metres in 2008.

Records
Leading jockey (8 wins):
 Georg Bocskai – Königsfels (1980), Abary (1982), Lagunas (1983), Lirung (1984), Zentaurus (1985), Zampano (1986), Belushi (1990), Barlovento (1995)

Leading trainer (14 wins):
 Heinz Jentzsch – Bandit (1965), Hitchcock (1968), Lombard (1969), Sheba (1972), Licata (1975), La Dorada (1976), Trianon (1977), Esclavo (1978), Abary (1982), Lagunas (1983), Lirung (1984), Zentaurus (1985), Zampano (1986), Macanal (1994)
 (note: the trainers of some of the early winners are unknown)

Winners since 1970

Earlier winners
 1876: Berggeist
 1877: Lateran
 1878: Tristan
 1879: F. F.
 1880: Walpurgis
 1881: Trachenberg
 1882: Architekt
 1883: Weltmann
 1884: Peregrin
 1885: Potrimpos
 1886: Pumpernickel
 1887: Hortari
 1888: Rochsburg
 1889: Dalberg
 1890: Walvater
 1891: Correcticus
 1892: Birkhahn
 1893: Naklo
 1894: Nixnutz
 1895: Erzlump
 1896: Wolkenschieber
 1897: Habenichts
 1898: Namouna
 1899: Don Jose
 1900: Daedalus / Nicus *
 1901: Hamilkar
 1902: Fama
 1903: Gika
 1904: Slaby
 1905: Fels
 1906: Desir

 1907: Galopade / Horizont *
 1908: Meister
 1909: Hort
 1910: Schill
 1911: Kreuzer
 1912: Csardas
 1913: Mischief
 1914: no race
 1915: Chaputchin
 1916: Frohsinn / Landstreicher *
 1917: Skarabae
 1918: Schnellfeuer
 1919: Wallenstein
 1920: König Midas
 1921: Abschied
 1922: Augias
 1923: Patrizier
 1924: Sisyphus
 1925: Aurelius
 1926: Mah Jong
 1927: Contessa Maddalena
 1928: Walzertraum
 1929: Ladro
 1930: Fathia
 1931: Mio d'Arezzo
 1932: Janitor
 1933: Athanasius
 1934: Valparaiso
 1935: Nereide
 1936: Iniga Isolani
 1937: Adlerfee

 1938: Wehr Dich
 1939: Finitor
 1940: Magnat
 1941: Ortwin
 1942: Balios
 1943: Träumerei
 1944: Kampfdegen
 1945–46: no race
 1947: Ostermorgen
 1948: Aubergine
 1949: Liebesorkan
 1950: Wacholdis
 1951: Leidenschaft
 1952: Liebesmahl
 1953: Usurpator
 1954: König Ottokar
 1955: Liebeslied
 1956: Orsini
 1957: Granit
 1958: Matterhorn
 1959: Santa Cruz
 1960: Orlog
 1961: Amboss
 1962: Parabola
 1963: Marinus
 1964: Granado
 1965: Bandit
 1966: Chevalier
 1967: Novara
 1968: Hitchcock
 1969: Lombard

* The 1900, 1907 and 1916 races were dead-heats and have joint winners.

See also

 List of German flat horse races
 Recurring sporting events established in 1876 – this race is included under its original title, Deutscher Gestüt-Preis.

References

 Racing Post / siegerlisten.com:
 1983, 1984, 1985, 1986, 1987, 1988, 1989, 1990, 1991, 1992
 1993, 1994, 1995, 1996, 1997, 1998, 1999, 2000, 2001, 2002
 2003, 2004, 
 galopp-sieger.de – Ratibor-Rennen.
 horseracingintfed.com – International Federation of Horseracing Authorities – Herzog von Ratibor-Rennen (2012).
 pedigreequery.com – Ratibor-Rennen – Krefeld.

Flat horse races for two-year-olds
Horse races in Germany
Sport in North Rhine-Westphalia